The title of Baron Herbert of Chirbury was created five times, twice in the Peerage of England, twice in the Peerage of Great Britain and once in the Peerage of the United Kingdom.

The title of Baron Herbert of Castle Island was created once in the Peerage of Ireland on 31 December 1624 for the 
Anglo-Welsh soldier, diplomat and poet Edward Herbert, who was created Baron Herbert of Cherbury, in the Peerage of England, on 7 May 1629. Both baronies became extinct on the death of the fourth baron in 1691.

The second English creation of the barony of Herbert of Chirbury was for Henry Herbert on 28 April 1694. On the second baron's death in 1738, the barony became extinct.

Both British creations (21 December 1743 and 16 October 1749) were for Henry Arthur Herbert and subsidiary titles of the earldom of Powis (creation of 1748). This creation of the barony became extinct together with the earldom in 1801.

The UK creation was for Edward Clive, 2nd Baron Clive of Plassey on 18 May 1804. And again, it was a subsidiary title of the earldom of Powis (creation of 1804).

There is a large public house in the village of Chirbury, Shropshire, called The Herbert Arms.

Barons Herbert of Castle Island (1624)
Edward Herbert, 1st Baron Herbert of Castle Island (created Baron Herbert of Chirbury in 1629)

Barons Herbert of Chirbury (1629)
Edward Herbert, 1st Baron Herbert of Chirbury (1583–1648)
Richard Herbert, 2nd Baron Herbert of Chirbury (–1655)
Edward Herbert, 3rd Baron Herbert of Chirbury (1633–1678)
Henry Herbert, 4th Baron Herbert of Chirbury (c. 1640–1691)

Barons Herbert of Chirbury (1694)
Henry Herbert, 1st Baron Herbert of Chirbury (1654–1709)
Henry Herbert, 2nd Baron Herbert of Chirbury (a.1678–1738)

Barons Herbert of Chirbury (1743 & 1749)
Henry Arthur Herbert, 1st Earl of Powis, 1st Baron Herbert of Chirbury (c.1703–1772)
For further Barons of these creations see Earl of Powis.

Barons Herbert of Chirbury (1804)
Edward Clive, 2nd Baron Clive of Plassey, 1st Earl of Powis, 1st Baron Herbert of Chirbury (1754–1839)
For further Barons of this creation see Earl of Powis

References

Extinct baronies in the Peerage of England
1629 establishments in England
Noble titles created in 1629
Noble titles created in 1694
Extinct baronies in the Peerage of Great Britain
Noble titles created in 1743
Noble titles created in 1749
Baronies in the Peerage of the United Kingdom
Noble titles created in 1804